Smodicum cucujiforme is a species of beetle in the family Cerambycidae. It was described by Say in 1826.

References

Cerambycinae
Beetles described in 1826